The Metropolitan League was a football league in the south-east of England between 1949 and 1971.

History
The league was founded in 1949 after several clubs learnt plans for a second division of the Southern League would come to nothing shortly before the start of the season, and was driven by Dagenham secretary Dave Thake, whose club were disappointed about being placed in the lower division of the London League. It was initially named the Home Counties League, but the name was rejected by the Football Association as the name was already in use. By the end of the league's inaugural season it had become known as the Metropolitan & District League, before being renamed the Metropolitan League in 1959. The league started with ten clubs and was largely composed of professional clubs or their reserve or youth teams, and was frequently described as an unofficial lower division of the Southern League. The league added a second division in 1963, but it ran for only a single season, which saw Gillingham Reserves win the title.

However, with the league reduced to only 12 clubs in 1970–71 and several of those about to leave to join the Southern League at the end of the season, the league merged with the Greater London League to form the Metropolitan–London League. This league ceased to exist in 1975 when it merged with the Spartan League to form the London Spartan League, which re-adopted the name Spartan League in 1987.

For three seasons an Amateur Cup was contested between the league's amateur teams; in 1951–52 and 1952–53 it was won by Windsor & Eton, whilst Vickers Armstrong won it in 1953–54. Thereafter it was awarded to the amateur team that finished highest in the league.

Champions

Member clubs

Arsenal 'A'
Ashford Town Reserves
Barnet Reserves
Bedford Town Reserves
Bexley United Reserves
Bletchley Town
Braintree & Crittall Athletic
Brentwood Town
Brentwood Town Reserves
Brighton & Hove Albion ‘A’
Bury Town
Callender Athletic
Cambridge City Reserves
Canterbury City
Canterbury City Reserves
Charlton Athletic 'A'
Chatham Town
Chelmsford City Reserves
Chelsea ‘A’
Chertsey Town
Chingford
Chingford Town Reserves
Chipperfield
Crawley Town
Crawley Town Reserves
Cray Wanderers
Croydon Rovers
Dagenham
Dartford Reserves
Deal Town Reserves
Dickinsons Athletic
Didcot Town
Dover Reserves
Dunstable Town
Dunstable Town Reserves
Eastbourne United
Epping Town
Folkestone Town Reserves
Fulham ‘A’
Gillingham Reserves
Gravesend & Northfleet Reserves
Guildford City Reserves
Hammersmith United
Hastings United Reserves
Hatfield Town
Haywards Heath
Hillingdon Borough Reserves
Horsham
Hove United
Kettering Town Reserves
Leatherhead
Luton Town 'A'
Margate Reserves
Metropolitan Police
Millwall 'A'
Newbury Town
Oxford United 'A'
Oxford United Reserves
Rainham Town
Ramsgate Athletic Reserves
Romford Reserves
Sheppey United
Sittingbourne Reserves
Skyways
Southwick
St Neots Town
Stevenage Athletic
Stevenage Town Reserves
Tonbridge Reserves
Tottenham Hotspur 'A'
Twickenham
Vickers Armstrong
Wellingborough Town
West Ham United 'A'
Wimbledon Reserves
Windsor & Eton
Wokingham Town
Woodford Town

See also
List of Metropolitan League seasons

References

 
Defunct football leagues in England
1949 establishments in England